That's Life is the 71st solo studio album by Willie Nelson. It was released on February 26, 2021, by Legacy Recordings. A tribute to Frank Sinatra, it represents the second volume of Nelson's Sinatra collection, following 2018's My Way.

Produced by Buddy Cannon and Matt Rollings, it was mainly recorded on Capitol Studios, the original studio used for several of Sinatra's recordings. Additional tracks were recorded at Nelson's Pedernales studio. The release was mixed by engineer Al Schmitt, featuring string and brass arrangements. The cover of the album features a painting of Nelson evoking the cover of Sinatra's In the Wee Small Hours.

That's Life is nominated for the 2022 Grammy Award for Best Traditional Pop Vocal Album.

Critical reception

That's Life received positive reviews from music critics. At Metacritic, which assigns a normalized rating out of 100 to reviews from mainstream critics, the album received a score of 80 out of 100 based on five reviews, indicating "generally favorable reviews."

Lee Zimmerman of American Songwriter said that Nelson "captures the feel and finesse of the original renditions and succeeds in making them his own." In The Daily Telegraph Neil McCormick praised the "different pathos" Nelson brought to the material and characterised the album as "another loving and elegant tribute to an old friend and American legend."

Track listing

Charts

References

2021 albums
Willie Nelson albums
Frank Sinatra tribute albums
Legacy Recordings albums
Albums produced by Buddy Cannon
Albums recorded at Capitol Studios